Virginia's 81st House of Delegates district elects one of 100 seats in the Virginia House of Delegates, the lower house of the state's bicameral legislature. District 81, in Virginia Beach and Chesapeake, Virginia, has been represented by Republican Barry Knight since 2010.

District officeholders

References

External links
 

Virginia House of Delegates districts
Virginia Beach, Virginia
Chesapeake, Virginia